Neal Avron (born December 31, 1965) is an American record producer, mixer, audio engineer, and musician. Working predominantly in rock music, Avron began working on records in 1993 and achieved his production breakthrough when he co-produced Everclear's 1997 album So Much for the Afterglow. Avron went on to produce/mix a string of successful albums from the likes of Switchfoot, New Found Glory, Fall Out Boy, Yellowcard, Weezer, You Me at Six and Anberlin.

Avron created headlines in 2010 when he mixed and/or produced each debuting number one album on the Billboard 200 for three consecutive weeks; Disturbed's Asylum, Sara Bareilles' Kaleidoscope Heart, and Linkin Park's A Thousand Suns. Avron later garnered recognition for his production work by receiving a Grammy Award nomination for Sara Bareilles' single "King of Anything" under the Best Female Pop Vocal Performance category.

Avron is noted for having particular recording techniques, believing that pre-production is essential before entering a recording studio. When recording, he prefers to lay down the drums and rhythm guitar first, as opposed to the conventional method of bass guitar and drums. Avron has noted, "Over the years I've had issues with recording bass first, especially when someone is hitting the strings really hard. For me it's difficult to tell whether the bass is in tune, because the fundamental is so low. When laying the rhythm guitars down first, it's much easier to tell whether the bass is out of tune or not. It also means that the bass has a place to fit."

Discography 
Selected discography (producer/mixing/engineering).

1997 – So Much for the Afterglow by Everclear
2000 – Songs from an American Movie Vol. One: Learning How to Smile by Everclear
2000 – New Found Glory by New Found Glory
2001 – Transmatic by Transmatic
2002 – Back to the Innocence by Seven and the Sun
2002 – Sticks and Stones by New Found Glory
2002 – Headspace by Pulse Ultra
2002 – Tomorrow by SR-71
2003 – Ocean Avenue by Yellowcard
2003 – Die Trying by Die Trying
2004 – Catalyst by New Found Glory
2004 – Nothing new since Rock 'n' Roll by The Fight
2005 – From Under the Cork Tree by Fall Out Boy
2005 – Make Believe by Weezer
2006 – Lights and Sounds by Yellowcard
2007 – Minutes to Midnight by Linkin Park
2007 – Empty Walls by Serj Tankian
2007 – Infinity on High by Fall Out Boy
2007 – Luna Halo by Luna Halo
2007 – Paper Walls by Yellowcard
2008 – Folie à Deux by Fall Out Boy
2008 – New Surrender by Anberlin
2008 – Indestructible by Disturbed
2009 – Artwork by The Used
2009 – Say Anything by Say Anything
2010 – Asylum by Disturbed
2010 – A Thousand Suns by Linkin Park
2010 – Kaleidoscope Heart by Sara Bareilles
2010 – Screamworks: Love in Theory and Practice by HIM
2011 – When You're Through Thinking, Say Yes by Yellowcard
2011 – Vice Verses by Switchfoot
2011 – Radiosurgery by New Found Glory
2012 – Southern Air by Yellowcard
2012 – Don't Panic by All Time Low
2013 – J.A.C.K. by Forever The Sickest Kids
2013 – Exhale EP by Stardog Champion
2014 – Cavalier Youth by You Me at Six
2014 – Fading West by Switchfoot
2014 – Lift a Sail by Yellowcard
2014 – Talking Is Hard by Walk the Moon
2014 – MALL (Music from the Motion Picture) by Mike Shinoda, Joseph Hahn, Dave Farrell, Chester Bennington, Alec Puro.
2015 – Blurryface by Twenty One Pilots
2015 – What's Inside: Songs From Waitress by Sara Bareilles
2016 – Taking One for the Team by Simple Plan
2016 – Waitress by Original Broadway Cast Recording
2016 – Unleashed by Skillet
2016 – Yellowcard by Yellowcard
2016 – Blurryface Live by Twenty One Pilots
2017 – Eternity, in Your Arms by Creeper
2018 – America by Thirty Seconds to Mars
2023 - So Much (For) Stardust by Fall Out Boy

References

External links 
 
 www.nealavron.com

1969 births
Living people
Record producers from California
American rock musicians
American keyboardists
Grammy Award winners
Musicians from Los Angeles
Avron, Neal